The James Cook Medal is awarded on an occasional basis by the Royal Society of New South Wales for "outstanding contributions to science and human welfare in and for the Southern Hemisphere". It was established in 1947 from funds donated by Henry Ferdinand Halloran, a member of the Society.

Recipients
Source: RSNSW

See also 

 List of general science and technology awards 
 List of prizes named after people

References

Australian science and technology awards
Awards established in 1947